The SMA SR460 is a French diesel aircraft engine, under development by SMA Engines of Bourges for use in light aircraft.

Design and development
The SR460 is a six-cylinder four-stroke, horizontally-opposed,  displacement, air and oil-cooled, direct-drive, diesel engine design. It will produce , depending on the model.

Specifications (SMA SR460)

See also

References

External links

 

SMA aircraft engines
Air-cooled aircraft piston engines
2010s aircraft piston engines
Aircraft diesel engines